is a junction railway station in the city of Ōdate, Akita, Japan, operated by the East Japan Railway Company (JR East). The station also has a freight depot for the Japan Freight Railway Company (JR Freight).

Lines
The station formerly also served the now-defunct Kosaka Smelting & Refining Kosaka Line.

Station layout
The station has a single side platform and single island platform serving three tracks, connected to the station building by a footbridge. The station has a Midori no Madoguchi staffed ticket office.

Platforms

History

Ōdate Station opened on November 15, 1899, on the Japanese Government Railways (JGR). The privately owned Kosaka Line began operations in 1909, and the privately owned Akita Railway began operations from July 1, 1914. The Hanaoka Line opened on January 26, 1916. The Akita Railway was nationalized on June 1, 1934.

After World War II, the JGR became the Japanese National Railways (JNR). The Hanaoka Line closed on April 1, 1985. The station was absorbed into the JR East network upon the privatization of JNR on April 1, 1987. Kosaka Line passenger operations ceased on October 1, 1994, and freight operations ended on March 12, 2008.

Hachikō

A statue of Hachikō was first erected in front of the station in July 1935, but was subsequently melted down for its metal content in World War II, and was not restored until November 1986.

Passenger statistics
In fiscal 2018, the station was used by an average of 906 passengers daily (boarding passengers only).

Surrounding area
 Ōdate Station Bus Stop
 Shūhoku Bus Main Office

See also
 List of Railway Stations in Japan

References

External links

 JR East Station information 

Railway stations in Akita Prefecture
Railway stations in Japan opened in 1899
Hanawa Line
Ōdate
Stations of Japan Freight Railway Company